Bampur-e Gharbi Rural District is a rural district (dehestan) in the Central District of Bampur County, Sistan and Baluchestan province, Iran. At the 2006 census, its population was 15,905, in 3,076 families.  The rural district has 28 villages.

References 

Rural Districts of Sistan and Baluchestan Province
Bampur County